was a feudal domain under the Tokugawa shogunate of Edo period Japan, located in Kōzuke Province (modern-day Gunma Prefecture), Japan. It was centered on Obata jin'ya in what is now part of the town of Kanra, Gunma. Obata was ruled through part of its history by the Oda clan, descendants of Oda Nobunaga.

History
Obata Domain was originally created in 1590 as a 30,000 koku holding for Okudaira Nobumasa, a son-in-law of Tokugawa Ieyasu. After the Battle of Sekigahara in 1601, he was promoted to the 100,000 koku holding of Kanō in Mino province and Obata was reduced to 10,000 koku and given to Mizuno Tadakiyo, a son of Mizuno Tadashige. For his efforts at the Siege of Osaka, he was transferred to the 20,000 koku Kariya Domain in Mikawa Province in 1615. Nagai Naokatsu, another of Ieyasu’s generals noted for his actions ay the Siege of Osaka then briefly ruled from 1616-1617.

In 1617, the domain was awarded to Oda Nobuyoshi, the grandson of Oda Nobunaga, and fourth son of Oda Nobukatsu, daimyō of Uda-Matsuyama Domain in Yamato Province. The Oda clan continued to rule Obata over the next seven generations until 1764, when they were transferred to Takahata Domain in Dewa Province. Obata was then awarded to the Okudaira-branch of the Matsudaira clan, who ruled until the end of the Edo period.

During the Bakumatsu period, the last daimyō, Matsudaira Tadayuki had served as Sōshaban and as Jisha-bugyō, positions which gave him insight into the weakness of the shogunate. Although he donated 500 ryō to support the shogunal military forces, he also made contact with the pro-imperial forces and many of his close advisers were from the radical Mito Domain. He also took steps to modernize his military, even to the extent of selling his prized heirloom Japanese sword to purchase modern rifles.  He was quick to join the imperial side in the Boshin War.

After the end of the conflict, with the abolition of the han system in July 1871, Obata Domain became “Obata Prefecture”, which later became part of Gunma Prefecture.

The domain had a population of 889 samurai in 238 households per a census in the Anei period (1772-1780).

Holdings at the end of the Edo period
Unlike most domains in the han system, which consisted of several discontinuous territories calculated to provide the assigned kokudaka, based on periodic cadastral surveys and projected agricultural yields, Obata was a relatively compact territory.

Kōzuke Province
1 village in Usui District
34 villages in Kanra District
3 villages in Tago District

List of daimyō

See also
Rakusan-en

References

External links
  Obata on "Edo 300 HTML"

Notes

Domains of Japan
1590 establishments in Japan
States and territories established in 1590
1871 disestablishments in Japan
States and territories disestablished in 1871
Kōzuke Province
Mizuno clan
Oda clan
Okudaira clan
Okudaira-Matsudaira clan